Brunswick is a rural community in the Whanganui District and Manawatū-Whanganui region of New Zealand's North Island.

History

The first European settlers to the area were the Campbell family, who arrived in February 1853 from the Canadian province of New Brunswick. They began farming 225 acres, which they called Brunswick farm; it later became a name for the whole area.

Politician John Bryce purchased a farm in Brunswick in 1851, following a short time in the Australian goldfields. He continued farming there for 50 years, including during his time as a local MP, the Minister of Native Affairs and the Leader of the Opposition.

In 1865, settler and provincial councillor James Hewett was killed by Māori, prompting European settlers to build four fortifications in the area.

In November 1871, Bryce personally directed the invasion of the Māori settlement of Parihaka and the arrest of the leaders of the movement, in line with his strict legal action against non-compliant Māori following the New Zealand Wars.

The National Library of New Zealand holds records of horses, cattle and gardens at Brunswick in the early 20th century, most from the Motohau Station farm.

In the 1930s, local dairy farms would deliver milk and cream by horse-drawn cart for local households.≈

Brunswick has a war memorial for the 12 local men who died in World War I and the three locals who died in World War II.

Demographics

There were 525 households. There were 696 males and 678 females, giving a sex ratio of 1.03 males per female. The median age was 48 years (compared with 37.4 years nationally), with 267 people (19.5%) aged under 15 years, 168 (12.3%) aged 15 to 29, 699 (51.0%) aged 30 to 64, and 243 (17.7%) aged 65 or older.

Ethnicities were 95.6% European/Pākehā, 9.2% Māori, 1.3% Pacific peoples, 1.3% Asian, and 1.3% other ethnicities (totals add to more than 100% since people could identify with multiple ethnicities).

The proportion of people born overseas was 13.6%, compared with 27.1% nationally.

Although some people objected to giving their religion, 51.4% had no religion, 38.7% were Christian, 0.2% were Muslim, 0.4% were Buddhist and 1.3% had other religions.

Of those at least 15 years old, 222 (20.1%) people had a bachelor or higher degree, and 177 (16.0%) people had no formal qualifications. The median income was $35,300, compared with $31,800 nationally. The employment status of those at least 15 was that 594 (53.8%) people were employed full-time, 201 (18.2%) were part-time, and 27 (2.4%) were unemployed.

Education

References 

Whanganui District
Populated places in Manawatū-Whanganui